Mezőgyán is a village in Békés County, in the Southern Great Plain region of south-east Hungary. It covers an area of 59.9 km² and has a population of 1,058 people (2015).

References

Populated places in Békés County